The Anaheim Ducks are a professional ice hockey team based in Anaheim, California. The Ducks compete in the Western Conference of the National Hockey League (NHL) as a member of the Pacific Division, and play their home games at Honda Center.

The team was founded in 1993 by the Walt Disney Company as the Mighty Ducks of Anaheim, a name based on the 1992 film The Mighty Ducks. In 2005, Disney sold the franchise to Henry and Susan Samueli, who, along with then-general manager Brian Burke, changed the name of the team to the Anaheim Ducks before the 2006–07 season.

History

Start of a franchise (1993–1996)

The Mighty Ducks of Anaheim were founded in 1993 by The Walt Disney Company. The franchise was awarded by the NHL in December 1992, along with the rights to a Miami team that would become the Florida Panthers. An entrance fee of $50 million was required, half of which Disney would pay directly to the Los Angeles Kings in order to "share" the Greater Los Angeles media market. On March 1, 1993, at the brand-new Anaheim Arena – located a short distance east of Disneyland and across the Orange Freeway from Angel Stadium – the team's name was announced. The team's name was inspired by the 1992 Disney film The Mighty Ducks, about a struggling youth hockey team who, with the help of their new coach, become champions. Philadelphia-arena management specialist Tony Tavares was chosen to be team president, and Jack Ferreira, who previously helped create the San Jose Sharks, became the Ducks' general manager. The Ducks selected Ron Wilson to be the first head coach in team history. The Ducks and the expansion Florida Panthers team filled out their rosters in the 1993 NHL Expansion Draft and the 1993 NHL Entry Draft. In the former, a focus on defense led to goaltenders Guy Hebert and Glenn Healy being the first picks, followed by Alexei Kasatonov and Steven King. In the latter, the Ducks selected as the fourth overall pick Paul Kariya, who only began play in 1994 but would turn out to be the face of the franchise for many years. The resulting roster had the lowest payroll of the NHL at only $7.9 million.

Led by captain Troy Loney, the Ducks finished the season 33–46–5, a record-breaking number of wins for an expansion team, which the Florida Panthers also achieved. The Ducks sold out 27 of 41 home games, including the last 25, and filled the Arrowhead Pond to 98.9% of its season capacity. Ducks licensed merchandise shot to number one in sales among NHL clubs, helped by their presence in Disney's theme parks and Disney Stores. The lockout-shortened 1994–95 NHL season saw the debut of Paul Kariya, who would play 47 of the team's 48 games that year, scoring 18 goals and 21 assists for 39 points. The Ducks had another respectable season, going 16–27–5.

Paul Kariya era (1996–2003)
During the 1995–96 season, Paul Kariya was chosen to play for the Western Conference in the 1996 NHL All-Star Game as the lone Ducks representative. At the time of his selection, (January 1996), Kariya was ranked 14th in league scoring with 51 points (23 goals and 28 assists) over 42 games, although the Ducks were overall a low-scoring team. Then a mid-season blockbuster deal with the Winnipeg Jets improved the franchise. The Ducks sent Chad Kilger, Oleg Tverdovsky and a third-round pick to the Jets in return for Marc Chouinard, a fourth-round draft pick and right winger Teemu Selanne. Following the trade, Ducks center Steve Rucchin commented, "Paul [Kariya] had a lot of pressure on him... He single-handedly won some games for us this year... Now that we have Teemu, there's no way everybody can just key on Paul." These three players formed one of the most potent lines of their time. Although the trade proved to be an important effort in the team, they still finished short of the playoffs, losing the eight spot in the Western Conference to the Winnipeg Jets based on the number of wins.

During the 1996–97 season, Kariya became team captain following Randy Ladouceur's retirement in the off-season, and led the Ducks to their first post-season appearance after recording the franchise's first winning record of 36–33–13, good enough for home ice in the first round as the fourth seed against the Phoenix Coyotes. The Ducks trailed 3–2 going into Phoenix for Game 6. Kariya scored in overtime to force the franchise's first Game 7, which they won. However, in the second round, they lost to the eventual Stanley Cup champions the Detroit Red Wings in a four-game sweep. After the season, Ron Wilson was fired after saying he would like to coach the Washington Capitals. Pierre Page succeeded him. The Ducks started out slowly in 1997–98, in part because Kariya missed the first 32 games of the season in a contract dispute. He came back in December, but on February 1, he suffered a season-ending concussion when the Chicago Blackhawks' Gary Suter cross-checked him in the face. With Kariya playing only a total of 22 games that season, the Ducks missed the playoffs and fired Page. The Ducks followed that season up by finishing sixth in the Western Conference in 1998–99 with new head coach Craig Hartsburg. However, they were swept by Detroit again, this time in the first round.

In the 1999–2000 season, the Ducks finished with the same number of points as the previous season, but a much more competitive Western Conference had them miss the playoffs by four points behind rival San Jose Sharks. Despite this, the Mighty Ducks scored more goals than the conference champion Dallas Stars. In the following season, 2000–01, the Ducks ended up performing worse, as Paul Kariya and Teemu Selanne's point production significantly declined from the previous season – Kariya went from 86 points to 67 points and Selanne went from 85 points to 57 points. Selanne was subsequently dealt to San Jose at the trade deadline for Jeff Friesen, Steve Shields and a second-round draft pick, while head coach Craig Hartsburg was fired during the season. The team ended up with a losing record and last place in the Western Conference that season. Without Selanne, Kariya's numbers continued to drop in the 2001–02 season with new coach Bryan Murray. The Mighty Ducks finished in 13th place in the Western Conference.

Western Conference champions (2002–2003)
The Mighty Ducks did not reach the post-season again until the 2002–03 season with head coach Mike Babcock. They entered the playoffs in seventh place with a 40–27–9–6 record, good enough for 95 points. In the first round, the Ducks were once again matched up with the Detroit Red Wings, the defending Stanley Cup champions. They shocked the hockey world by sweeping the Red Wings in four games. Steve Rucchin scored the series-winning goal in overtime in Game 4. In the second round, the Ducks faced the Dallas Stars. Game 1 turned out to be the fourth-longest game in NHL history, with Petr Sykora scoring in the fifth overtime to give the Mighty Ducks the series lead. The Ducks would finish off the Stars in Game 6 at home. In the team's first trip to the Western Conference Finals, they were matched up against another Cinderella team, the sixth-seeded, three-year-old Minnesota Wild. Jean-Sebastien Giguere strung together three consecutive shutouts and allowed only one total goal in the series in an eventual sweep.

The 2003 Stanley Cup Finals, to be played against the New Jersey Devils, had multiple interesting story lines. Anaheim forward Rob Niedermayer was playing against his brother Scott, while Giguere faced off against fellow French-Canadian goaltender Martin Brodeur. The series began with the home team winning the first five games. In Game 6 at home, Kariya was knocked out from a hit by Devils captain Scott Stevens. However, Kariya would return in the second period and score the fourth goal of the game. In an exciting third period, the Mighty Ducks defeated the Devils 5–2 to send the series back to New Jersey for Game 7. Anaheim, however, could not complete their winning streak, as they lost a hard-fought Game 7 to the Devils 3–0. For his brilliant play during the post-season, Giguere was awarded the Conn Smythe Trophy as the Most Valuable Player (MVP) of the playoffs. He became only the fifth player in NHL history to have won the trophy as a member of the losing team. Giguere posted a 15–6 record, 7–0 in overtime, with a 1.62 goals against average, a .945 save percentage and a record 168-minute, 27-second shutout streak in overtime.

Pronger era, Selanne's return and franchise rebrand (2003–2007)

After the season, Kariya promised to bring the Mighty Ducks back to the Stanley Cup Final the following year. However, Kariya left the Ducks in the summer and joined former teammate Teemu Selanne on the Colorado Avalanche. The 2003–04 season was a season to forget, as Jean-Sebastien Giguere could not repeat his stellar goaltending from the previous year. Even with newcomers Sergei Fedorov and Vaclav Prospal, the team finished in 12th place in the standings with a 29–35–10–8 record. Giguère's stats subsequently declined from the previous season, as he only won half the games he did the year before, his goals-against average increased from 2.30 to 2.62, his save percentage went down from .914 to .907 and he went from eight shutouts recorded to just three. The team also went from 203 goals to 174.

During the summer of 2004, as the NHL and the National Hockey League Players' Association (NHLPA)'s labor dispute was headed towards a long lockout, Disney tried to sell the team but received a low offer of US$40 million, less than the franchise's original price. In 2005, Broadcom Corporation co-founder Henry Samueli of Irvine, California, and his wife Susan bought the Mighty Ducks from The Walt Disney Company for a reported US$75 million. The Samuelis family pledged to keep the team in Anaheim. Brian Burke, former Vancouver Canucks general manager and president, was appointed general manager and executive vice-president of the Mighty Ducks on June 20, 2005.

On August 1, 2005, former Norris Trophy-winning defenseman Randy Carlyle was hired as the seventh head coach in team history. Burke was familiar with Carlyle's coaching ability, as the latter had coached the Manitoba Moose from 1996 to 2001 (International Hockey League) and 2004–05 (American Hockey League); the Moose had been the Canucks farm club since 2001. Carlyle replaced Mike Babcock, who later signed on to coach Detroit. On August 4, 2005, free-agent defenseman Scott Niedermayer signed with the Mighty Ducks to play with his brother Rob; Scott Niedermayer was almost immediately named team captain. On August 22, Teemu Selanne returned to Anaheim after undergoing knee surgery. He led the team in scoring during the season with 40 goals and 50 assists for 90 points. He would also record his 1,000th NHL point on January 30, 2006.

The 2005–06 season also saw the emergence of rookies Ryan Getzlaf, Corey Perry and Chris Kunitz (Kunitz also played for the Ducks in 2003–04, but immediately returned to the Mighty Ducks' AHL affiliate, the Cincinnati Mighty Ducks). On November 15, 2005, Anaheim traded Sergei Fedorov and a fifth-round draft pick to the Columbus Blue Jackets in exchange for defenseman Francois Beauchemin and forward Tyler Wright.

The Ducks finished the season with a 43–27–12 record, good enough for 98 points and the sixth seed. The Ducks faced the Calgary Flames in the Western Conference quarter-finals and forced a seventh game in Calgary, shutting out the Flames to reach the Conference semi-finals. In an interesting playoffs, all the bottom seeds won in the first round, so the Ducks matched-up against the seventh-seeded Colorado Avalanche. Goaltender Ilya Bryzgalov shined as the Ducks swept the Avalanche in four-straight games, Bryzgalov breaking Giguere's scoreless streak record from the 2003 Stanley Cup playoffs. In the franchise's second Western Conference Finals appearance, they faced the eighth-seeded Edmonton Oilers, a series the Ducks would ultimately lose in five games.

In January 2006, Samueli announced the team would be renamed as simply the "Anaheim Ducks" as of the following season.

Stanley Cup champions (2006–2007)
Prior to the 2006–07 season, the Ducks adopted a completely new look to go along with their new name; their team colors became black, gold and orange, and the logo of a duck-shaped goalie mask was dropped in favor of the word "Ducks", with a webbed foot in place of the "D".

The Ducks traded Joffrey Lupul, Ladislav Smid and a first-round draft pick to the Edmonton Oilers in exchange for star defenseman Chris Pronger. With this trade, solid scoring lines, a shut-down line featuring Rob Niedermayer, Samuel Pahlsson and Travis Moen and an enviable defense, the Ducks were considered by many to be a Stanley Cup favorite. On November 9, 2006, the Ducks defeated the Vancouver Canucks 6–0 at General Motors Place in Vancouver to improve their season record to 12–0–4. The win set an NHL open era record by remaining undefeated in regulation for the first 16 games of the season, eclipsing the previous mark set by the 1983–84 Edmonton Oilers (the record has since been broken by the Chicago Blackhawks' 21–0–3 start during the 2012–13 season). Anaheim were subsequently shut out by the Flames the following game, 3–0, ending their streak. On January 16, 2007, the Ducks played in their franchise's 1,000th regular-season game, and on March 11, the Ducks recorded their franchise's 1,000th point with a 4–2 win over the Canucks, which improved their franchise all-time record to 423–444–155, with 1,001 points. On April 7, the Ducks won their first division title in franchise history when the Canucks defeated the second-place San Jose Sharks in the final game of the season. The Ducks ended the regular season with a 48–20–14 record and 110 points. It was the franchise's first 100-point season. Although they had three fewer wins than the Nashville Predators, the Ducks won the second seed in the West by virtue of winning the Pacific Division title; the Predators finished second in the Central Division behind the Detroit Red Wings (the top seed in the West).

The Ducks defeated the Minnesota Wild in the Conference quarter-finals in five games and the Canucks in the semi-finals, also in five games. Once again, the Ducks faced the Detroit Red Wings in the franchise's third trip to the Western Conference Finals. In Game 3, Chris Pronger elbowed Tomas Holmstrom and subsequently received a one-game suspension for the illegal check. However, the Ducks won Game 4 without Pronger and Game 5 in Detroit, with Teemu Selanne scoring the latter game's overtime winner. The Ducks then finished off the Red Wings in Game 6 for their second-ever Stanley Cup Final appearance.

In the Finals, the Ducks won the first two games at home against the Ottawa Senators. However, the Ducks lost Game 3 and Pronger received his second one-game suspension, this time for elbowing Dean McAmmond. The Ducks were again able to win without Pronger, defeating the Senators in Game 4 for an opportunity to win the Stanley Cup on home ice in Game 5. On June 6, the Ducks defeated the Senators 6–2 at Honda Center to claim their first Stanley Cup in franchise history. Travis Moen was credited with the Cup game-winning goal. Scott Niedermayer, the only player on the team who had previously won a Stanley Cup, was awarded the second Conn Smythe Trophy in Ducks history. The Ducks became the first California team, and the fourth West Coast team since the 1915 Vancouver Millionaires, 1917 Seattle Metropolitans and 1925 Victoria Cougars, to win the Stanley Cup.

Post-Stanley Cup, Bob Murray replaces Burke (2007–2010)
The Ducks began their title defense in the 2007–08 season without two fan favorites, Scott Niedermayer and Teemu Selanne, who were both contemplating retirement. To offset those losses, Burke signed forward Todd Bertuzzi and defenseman Mathieu Schneider. During the season, Burke put goaltender Ilya Bryzgalov on waivers, where he was picked up by the Phoenix Coyotes. Free-agent signee Jonas Hiller then became the back-up to starter Jean-Sebastien Giguere. Both Selanne and Niedermayer would ultimately return and the team finished with a 47–27–8 record, good enough to earn home-ice advantage in the first round of the playoffs finishing as the fourth seed in the Western Conference. They were eliminated in the quarterfinals in six games by the Dallas Stars. In the off-season, Burke bought out the remaining year on Todd Bertuzzi's contract and traded Mathieu Schneider to the Atlanta Thrashers.

After an extremely slow start to the 2008–09 season, on November 12, 2008, Burke resigned to take the same position for the Toronto Maple Leafs. Bob Murray replaced him as general manager, but the team struggled to make the playoffs as the eighth seed in the Western Conference. A bevy of trade deadline deals saw the departure of some mainstays from the Cup team, including Chris Kunitz, who was traded to the Pittsburgh Penguins for defenseman Ryan Whitney; Samuel Pahlsson, who was traded to the Columbus Blue Jackets for defenseman James Wisniewski; and Travis Moen, who was traded to the San Jose Sharks for two prospects. The trades gave the Ducks new life as a hot streak to end the season launched the team into the playoffs. Jonas Hiller emerged as the new number one goalie during the stretch drive. The Ducks defeated the number one seed and Presidents' Trophy-winning San Jose Sharks in six games in the first round before being eliminated in the conference semi-finals by the eventual Western Conference champion Detroit Red Wings in seven games. Before the 2009–10 season, the Ducks traded Chris Pronger to the Philadelphia Flyers for Joffrey Lupul, Luca Sbisa and two first-round draft picks. Francois Beauchemin and Rob Niedermayer also left via free agency for the Toronto Maple Leafs and New Jersey Devils, respectively. The Ducks then signed free agent center and former Montreal Canadiens captain Saku Koivu to a one-year deal.

Another slow start would doom the Ducks. Before the trade deadline, the Ducks traded Giguere to the Toronto Maple Leafs for Jason Blake and Vesa Toskala after signing Hiller to a contract extension. The trade deadline saw the Ducks trade Ryan Whitney to Edmonton for offensive defenseman Lubomir Visnovsky, as well as the acquisitions of defenseman Aaron Ward from the Carolina Hurricanes and goalie Curtis McElhinney from the Calgary Flames. The Ducks played through frequent injuries and picked up play in the second half of the season, but struggled coming out of the Olympic break. For the first time since the lockout, the Ducks failed to make the playoffs with a 39–32–11 record. The 2010 off-season was also busy for the Ducks, as Scott Niedermayer announced his retirement in a June press conference. Niedermayer decided to stay a member of the Ducks as a team consultant. The Ducks resigned Saku Koivu for two years and signed free agent defenseman Toni Lydman to a three-year contract. In addition to Lydman, the Ducks were able to get defenseman Cam Fowler via the draft, and 35-year-old strong-willed defenseman Andy Sutton signed to a two-year deal. Restricted free agent Bobby Ryan was signed to a five-year deal.

Getzlaf and Perry era (2010–2018)

The 2010–11 season did not begin well for the Ducks, who would lose their first three games. They maintained a .500 throughout record through the first half of the season, but would find their rhythm and finish 47–30–5, good for 99 points and fourth place in the Western Conference. Corey Perry and Jonas Hiller represented the Ducks at the All-Star Game, and Corey Perry went on to have a 50-goal, 98-point season, which won him the Maurice "Rocket" Richard Trophy and Hart Memorial Trophy. He became the first-ever Duck to win the Hart, as well as the first Richard winner as a Duck since Teemu Selanne won the award in 1999. However, Hiller was injured at the All-Star Game and missed the rest of the season. Even though the Ducks had a great season led by Perry, Hiller, Selanne, Visnovsky and Getzlaf, they would end up losing in the first round of the 2011 playoffs to the fifth-seeded Nashville Predators.

Before the 2011–12 season began, the team mourned the loss of former Mighty Duck Ruslan Salei, who died in a plane crash with several other former NHL players of Kontinental Hockey League (KHL) club Lokomotiv Yaroslavl. The team wore a black patch with his former jersey number, 24, in current team numbering. The Ducks started the season with NHL Premiere games in Helsinki and Stockholm. This was the third time in franchise history that they started the regular season with games in Europe. They lost 4–1 to the Buffalo Sabres in Helsinki but defeated the New York Rangers 2–1 after a shootout in Stockholm. After a slow start to the season, the Ducks replaced head coach Randy Carlyle with former Washington Capitals head coach Bruce Boudreau. The rest of the season was mostly forgettable, as the Ducks could not get out of the hole they dug themselves in the first half of the season, and ultimately failed to reach the playoffs in the 2011–12 season.

The 2012–13 season was shortened to 48 games due to a labor lockout. When play resumed in January 2013 after a new collective bargaining agreement was signed, the Ducks opened the season by sweeping a two-game Canadian road trip with a decisive 7–3 victory against the Vancouver Canucks on January 19, followed by a 5–4 decision against the Calgary Flames on January 21. Their home opener came on January 25, also against the Canucks, who would prevail 5–0. The distinction of the Ducks' longest homestand was split between two five-game stretches from March 18–25 and from April 3–10. Anaheim's lengthiest road trip was a six-game haul from February 6–16. Due to the shortened season and the compacted game scheduling, all games were to be played against the Ducks' own Western Conference opponents, and no games were played against Eastern Conference teams. The Ducks finished the season with a 30–12–6 record and would win their second Pacific Division title in franchise history. In the Western Conference quarter-finals, they ended up losing to the seventh-seeded Detroit Red Wings in seven games, despite holding a 3–2 series lead after Game 5.

Entering the 2013–14 season, the 20th anniversary of the franchise, it was announced that Teemu Selanne would be playing in his final NHL season. In the off-season, star forward Bobby Ryan was traded to the Ottawa Senators in exchange for forwards Jakob Silfverberg, Stefan Noesen and Ottawa's first-round pick in the 2014 NHL Entry Draft, and the Ducks also signed defenseman Mark Fistric, center Mathieu Perreault and a returning Dustin Penner. Despite a bad start suffering a 6–1 mauling at the hands of the Colorado Avalanche, the Ducks followed the opener with seven-straight wins, a run which was repeated and surpassed twice more during the season, including a franchise-record setting ten consecutive wins from December 6 to 28, 2013. At one point of the season, the Ducks won 18 of 19 games, the longest run of one-loss play in the NHL for 45 years. A 9–1 victory over the Vancouver Canucks on January 15 saw Anaheim establish a 20–0–2 record at the Honda Center, which matched the longest season-opening home points streak in 34 years, as well as setting a franchise record for goals scored in a game (9), and powerplay goals scored in a game (6). Dustin Penner was eventually traded to the Washington Capitals, and prior to the NHL trade deadline, the Ducks acquired veteran defenseman Stephane Robidas from the Dallas Stars. Behind a Hart Trophy-caliber season from club captain Ryan Getzlaf, solid depth scoring, a steady if unspectacular defence and solid goaltending in the form of Jonas Hiller and rookie Frederik Andersen, many felt that the Ducks were primed to be a top contender for the Stanley Cup.

The Ducks remained towards the top of the NHL standings for the entire season, ending the regular season with a franchise-best 54–20–8 record (116 points) and eventually finishing one point behind the Boston Bruins in the race for the Presidents' Trophy, awarded to the team finishing the regular season with the best record. The Ducks secured a second consecutive Pacific Division title and the number one seed in the Western Conference. Anaheim faced the eighth-seeded Dallas Stars in the Western Conference quarter-finals and were victorious in six games, marking the first time since 2009 that the Ducks had won a playoff series. In the Western Conference semi-finals, the Ducks faced their geographic rival and eventual Stanley Cup champion Los Angeles Kings for the first time ever in the playoffs. In a hotly contested series, the Ducks ultimately went down in seven games to their Southern Californian rivals, losing Game 7 by a score of 6–2 at the Honda Center.

On June 27, 2014, the Ducks acquired center Ryan Kesler and a third-round pick in 2015 from the Vancouver Canucks. In the following season, they would win their third-straight Pacific Division title and finish as the top seed in the West with 109 points. In the 2015 playoffs, they swept the Winnipeg Jets in the first round and beat the Calgary Flames in five games to set up a Western Conference final against the Chicago Blackhawks. After taking three games to two series lead on the strong play of goaltender Frederik Andersen, the Ducks lost the final two games of the series, including Game 7 on home ice. This marked the third-straight season the Ducks had lost a series in Game 7 at home after leading the series three games to two.

On July 15, 2015, the Ducks signed Ryan Kesler to a six-year contract extension totaling a reported $41.25 million. Just prior to the 2015 NHL Entry Draft, the Ducks sent Emerson Etem and a draft pick to the New York Rangers in exchange for speedy left-wing Carl Hagelin. They also traded for Vancouver Canucks defenseman Kevin Bieksa and adding veterans Shawn Horcoff, Chris Stewart and Mike Santorelli. Entering the 2015–16 NHL season, many analysts pegged the Ducks as Stanley Cup favorites. However, scoring struggles led to a slow start, with the team still out of a playoff spot in December. The team improved afterwards riding the goaltending of John Gibson. On March 6, 2016, the Ducks set a franchise record with an 11-game winning streak which ended the following night. On March 24, 2016, the Ducks clinched a playoff spot in a 6–5 overtime loss to the Maple Leafs. However, in the first round of the playoffs, they fell in seven games to the Nashville Predators, which led to the firing of head coach Bruce Boudreau. On June 14, 2016, the Ducks announced they re-hired former head coach Randy Carlyle.

On May 10, 2017, the Ducks ended their Game 7 losing streak when they defeated the Edmonton Oilers, winning the series 4–3 and advancing to the Western Conference finals for the second time in three seasons. They would fall to the Nashville Predators in Game 6, ending their playoff run. In the following season, the Ducks failed to win the Pacific Division for the first time since the 2011–12 season. They clinched a playoff berth, but were swept by the San Jose Sharks in the First Round.

Rebuild and new head coach (2018–present)
In 2019, the Ducks fired Carlyle and replaced him with Bob Murray as interim head coach; however, the Ducks missed the playoffs for the second time since the 2002–03 NHL season. On June 17, 2019, the team named Dallas Eakins as the franchise's 10th head coach.

On November 9, 2021, Murray was placed on administrative leave by the Ducks pending the results of an ongoing investigation. The investigation is reportedly focused on Murray's alleged history of verbal abuse to players and staff members. Assistant general manager Jeff Solomon was initially named as acting general manager but was then named interim general manager when Murray resigned on November 10. Pat Verbeek was named general manager on February 3, 2022.

Team information

Name
Founded in 1993, the then-called Mighty Ducks of Anaheim were directly named for The Mighty Ducks movies. When The Walt Disney Company, which produced the movies and owned the NHL team, sold the team in 2005, the name was shortened to its current state, "Anaheim Ducks."

Uniforms

1993–2006
The Mighty Ducks' original road (later home) jersey features an eggplant and jade base, divided by silver, purple and white diagonal stripes. The home (later road) jersey has a white and jade base, divided by purple, white and silver diagonal stripes. For most of its history, purple pants were used with this set; from 1993 to 1997, and from 1999 to 2003, the pants featured jade and white stripes. In 1996, an alternate front-facing "angry duck mask" logo is added on the shoulders.

In 1995, as part of the NHL's third jersey program, the Mighty Ducks wore alternate "Wild Wing" jerseys, featuring the current mascot breaking out of a sheet of ice amid a jade base and purple trim. The primary logo appears on both shoulders. Even though the Mighty Ducks won two of three games with this uniform, it was immediately retired.

From 1997 to 1999, the Mighty Ducks wore two alternate jerseys. The road alternate has a jade base with purple, jade and silver stripes along the chest and sleeves, and the home alternate has a white base with jade, purple and silver stripes along the chest and sleeves. During this period, the Mighty Ducks switched to black pants and helmets, but in 1999, returned to wearing purple pants and helmets while retiring the road alternate jerseys.

In 2003, the Mighty Ducks released a black alternate jersey with purple and silver trim. This design features the full team name written in a classic script style, and the interlocking "MD" on both shoulders.

2006–2014
After rebranding as the Anaheim Ducks, the uniforms became black and white with metallic gold and orange stripes. The crest featured the full team name in front. This set was worn until the 2013–14 season, with a few adjustments after Reebok moved to the Edge template in 2007.

In 2010, the Ducks unveiled a black alternate jersey, featuring the "webbed D" as the main crest and thick orange stripes. The original Mighty Ducks logo, this time recolored to the current scheme and placed inside a white oval with the full team name, was placed on the shoulders.

For their Stadium Series game on January 25, 2014, the Ducks created a special jersey. This jersey is primarily orange with black lettering and numbers. The chromed Ducks logo, designed for the Stadium Series, is on the chest. There are gold, black and white stripes on the sleeves as well as black trim around the bottom and sleeves. The jersey has old fashion black lace on the neck and also has a unique "OC" logo on the left shoulder to represent Orange County where the Ducks are from.

2014–present
In 2014, the "webbed D" alternate became the primary jersey, and a corresponding white jersey was also unveiled. The letters, previously with a gold accent, now featured orange accents. This set was later tweaked in 2017 after Adidas became the NHL's uniform provider.

In 2015, an orange third jersey was unveiled, with the modified Mighty Ducks crest in front. The "webbed D" was moved to the shoulders. This set is used until 2017, and was brought back in a modern Adidas template starting in 2019. 

The Ducks announced for their 25th anniversary season of 2018–19 the adoption of a new third jersey, featuring the original Mighty Ducks logo, striping pattern, and purple and jade colors. While it had the elements of the original jersey, it kept the modern-day aspects of the Ducks identity such as the "webbed D" on the shoulders, black base and current lettering. The uniform was only used for that particular season, after which the Ducks returned to the orange thirds last used from 2015–17.

For the 2020–21 season, Adidas released a special alternate uniform called the "Reverse Retro" series, which were alternate color versions of throwback uniform designs. The Ducks' version was a white rendition of their 1995–96 "Wildwing" alternates. A second "Reverse Retro" uniform was unveiled in the 2022–23 season, this time with the 1993–2006 white uniform recolored to the current orange, black and gold colors.

Colors and logos

The team's colors were eggplant and jade until the change of ownership in 2006. At this point, they became orange, black and gold, with white in place of black for the away jersey. The only exception is the alternate jersey, which is mostly orange. Orange, which has become one of the team's primary colors, is in reference to Orange County, where Anaheim is located.

The Ducks' logo features a webbed foot forming a "D". The text itself is gold (which sometimes may appear as bronze as well) with orange and black accents (forming a three-dimensional appearance). The entire logo is in turn outlined by silver. This is shortened from a prior version that spelled out the word "Ducks" in all capital letters.

The old logo of the Ducks prior to the name change featured an old-style goaltender mask, shaped to form the appearance of a duck bill. Behind the mask are two intersecting hockey sticks, a black hockey puck, and a triangle; the color of the triangle was either green or gray, depending on how the logo is used. This is now used on a shoulder patch of the current uniforms, with the triangle in orange.

Mascot
The official mascot for the Anaheim Ducks is an anthropomorphized duck by the name of Wild Wing. He has been the team's mascot since its inaugural season, and his name was chosen through fan voting. He wears a Ducks jersey with the number 93 on the back, referring to the year the Ducks became an NHL team.

He regularly descends from the rafters of the arena when making his in-game entrances. In one such descent the rigging that lowered Wild Wing from the rafters malfunctioned leaving the mascot trapped fifty feet above the ice for several minutes. Another well known blunder occurred in October 1995 when Wild Wing, attempting to jump through a "wall of fire", accidentally tripped causing the mascot to land on the fire and set his costume ablaze.

His physical appearance is similar to the duck mask in the original Mighty Ducks logo. A bronze statue of Wild Wing was located outside the south doors of Honda Center from 1993 to 2012, until construction began on the 'Grand Terrace' addition to the arena. When construction was completed and the Grand Terrace opened in October 2013, the statue was noticeably absent.

The mascot was the inspiration for the character Wildwing Flashblade in Disney's Mighty Ducks cartoon series.

During the same time in which the team announced a name change as well as change in jersey designs, there was an attempt by the team's owners to change or replace the mascot, Wild Wing, but was halted after a highly successful petition by fans.

The Mighty Ducks also used a secondary "mascot", a person (with no particular costume) called "The Iceman", during the team's first game in 1993. "The Iceman" appeared occasionally in the stands, played an electric guitar, and attempted to liven up the crowd. However, "The Iceman" was poorly received by fans and was quickly eliminated as the Ducks lost to the Red Wings in their inaugural game, 7–2.

Rivalries

The Ducks have two rivalries with two teams out of geographical proximity. The Freeway Face-Off with the Los Angeles Kings as both teams arenas are accessible via Interstate 5 in California and the fact that both teams are within the greater Los Angeles metropolitan area. 

The Ducks also have a rivalry with the San Jose Sharks. Despite the arenas being six hours away from each other, the teams have developed a strong rivalry, primarily from the 2009 and 2018 Stanley Cup playoffs. The Ducks won the series in 2009, but the Sharks came back in 2018.

Season-by-season record
This is a partial list of the last five seasons completed by the Ducks. For the full season-by-season history, see List of Anaheim Ducks seasons.

Note: GP = Games played, W = Wins, L = Losses, T = Ties, OTL = Overtime Losses, Pts = Points, GF = Goals for, GA = Goals against

Players and personnel

Current roster

Team captains

 Troy Loney, 1993–1994
 Randy Ladouceur, 1994–1996
 Paul Kariya, 1996–2003
 Teemu Selanne, 1998 (interim)
 Steve Rucchin, 2003–2004
 Scott Niedermayer, 2005–2007, 2008–2010
 Chris Pronger, 2007–2008
 Ryan Getzlaf, 2010–2022

Coaches

 Ron Wilson, 1993–1997
 Pierre Page, 1997–1998
 Craig Hartsburg, 1998–2000
 Guy Charron, 2000–2001
 Bryan Murray, 2001–2002
 Mike Babcock, 2002–2004
 Randy Carlyle, 2005–2011, 2016–2019
 Bruce Boudreau, 2011–2016
 Bob Murray, 2019 (interim)
 Dallas Eakins, 2019–present

General managers

 Jack Ferreira, 1993–1998
 Pierre Gauthier, 1998–2002
 Bryan Murray, 2002–2004
 Al Coates, 2004–2005 (interim)
 Brian Burke, 2005–2008
 Bob Murray, 2008–2021
 Jeff Solomon, 2021–2022 (interim)
 Pat Verbeek, 2022–present

League and team honors

NHL awards and trophies

Stanley Cup
 2006–07

Clarence S. Campbell Bowl
 2002–03, 2006–07

Conn Smythe Trophy
 Jean-Sebastien Giguere: 2002–03
 Scott Niedermayer: 2006–07

Hart Memorial Trophy
 Corey Perry: 2010–11

William M. Jennings Trophy
 Frederik Andersen and John Gibson: 2015–16

Lady Byng Memorial Trophy
 Paul Kariya: 1995–96, 1996–97

Bill Masterton Memorial Trophy
 Teemu Selanne: 2005–06

Maurice "Rocket" Richard Trophy
 Teemu Selanne: 1998–99
 Corey Perry: 2010–11

NHL General Manager of the Year Award
 Bob Murray: 2013–14

First All-Star team
 Paul Kariya: 1995–96, 1996–97, 1998–99
 Teemu Selanne: 1996–97
 Scott Niedermayer: 2005–06, 2006–07
 Corey Perry: 2010–11, 2013–14

Second All-Star team
 Teemu Selanne: 1997–98, 1998–99
 Paul Kariya: 1999–2000, 2002–03
 Chris Pronger: 2006–07
 Lubomir Visnovsky: 2010–11
 Francois Beauchemin: 2012–13
 Ryan Getzlaf: 2013–14

NHL All-Rookie Team
 Paul Kariya: 1994–95
 Bobby Ryan: 2008–09
 Hampus Lindholm: 2013–14
 Frederik Andersen: 2013–14
 John Gibson: 2015–16
 Trevor Zegras: 2021–22

Retired numbers

The Anaheim Ducks currently have three retired numbers, Teemu Selanne's no. 8, which was retired on January 11, 2015, before a game against the Winnipeg Jets, Paul Kariya's no. 9, retired on October 21, 2018, before a game against the Buffalo Sabres, and Scott Niedermayer's no. 27 on February 17, 2019, before a game against the Washington Capitals.

The NHL retired Wayne Gretzky's No. 99 for all its member teams at the 2000 NHL All-Star Game.

Notes
 Selanne wore number 8 for 14 of his 15 seasons with the Ducks, he would wear number 13 during the 2005–06 season before returning to number 8 from the 2006–07 season onward.

Hall of Famers
The Anaheim Ducks hold an affiliation with a number of inductees to the Hockey Hall of Fame. Seven inductees from the players category of the Hall of Fame played for the Ducks. Of those seven, Kariya and Selanne earned their credentials primarily with the Ducks.

Franchise scoring leaders
These are the top-ten point-scorers in franchise history. Figures are updated after each completed NHL regular season.
  – current Ducks player
Note: Pos = Position; GP = Games played; G = Goals; A = Assists; Pts = Points; P/G = Points per game

Franchise playoff scoring leaders 

These are the top-ten playoff point-scorers in franchise playoff history. Figures are updated after each completed NHL season.

Note: Pos = Position; GP = Games played; G = Goals; A = Assists; Pts = Points; P/G = Points per game; * = current Ducks player

Franchise single-season records

 Most goals: Teemu Selanne, 52 (1997–98)
 Most assists: Ryan Getzlaf, 66 (2008–09)
 Most points: Teemu Selanne, 109 (1996–97)
 Most penalty minutes: Todd Ewen, 285 (1995–96)
 Most goals, defenseman: Lubomir Visnovsky, 18 (2010–11)
 Most assists, defenseman: Scott Niedermayer, 54 (2006–07)
 Most points, defenseman: Scott Niedermayer, 69 (2006–07)
 Most goals, rookie: Bobby Ryan, 31 (2008–09)
 Most assists, rookie: Trevor Zegras, 38 (2021–22)
 Most points, rookie: Trevor Zegras, 61 (2021–22)
 Most wins: Jean-Sebastien Giguere, 36 (2006–07)
 Most shutouts: Jean-Sebastien Giguere, 8 (2002–03)

All-time franchise records

Regular season

 Most games: Ryan Getzlaf, 1,157
 Most goals: Teemu Selanne, 457
 Most assists: Ryan Getzlaf, 737
 Most points: Ryan Getzlaf, 1019
 Best plus/minus: Teemu Selanne, 120
 Most power-play goals: Teemu Selanne, 182
 Most game-winning goals: Teemu Selanne, 77
 Most overtime goals: Ryan Getzlaf, 11
 Most shots: Teemu Selanne, 2,964

Playoffs

 Most playoff games: Ryan Getzlaf, 121
 Most playoff goals: Ryan Getzlaf, 37
 Most playoff assists: Ryan Getzlaf, 81
 Most playoff points: Ryan Getzlaf, 118
 Most playoff power-play goals: Ryan Getzlaf and Teemu Selanne, 15
 Most playoff game-winning goals: Corey Perry and Teemu Selanne, 8
 Most playoff shots: Corey Perry, 328

Corporate sponsors
The Anaheim Ducks have a variety of corporate partnerships. In addition to the partnership with the Honda Center, the Ducks have partnered with Olive (Olive.com), Chick-fil-A, Hestan Commercial Corporation, Pacific Surfliner, Bodhi Leaf Coffee Traders, Wawanesa Insurance, Cutwater Spirits, Jerome's Furniture Warehouse, and All Nippon Airways.

As part of a multi-year agreement, Olive.com is the Official Mechanical Breakdown Coverage Provider of the Anaheim Ducks and Honda Center. In California, Extended Car Warranties are called Mechanical Breakdown Insurance.

The Ducks also have a multi-year partnership with Chick-fil-A to increase community outreach in the Southern California area. From this partnership, Chick-fil-A has been integrated into The RINKS program, which is designed to help spread grassroots hockey throughout Orange County. Chick-Fil-A has been featured as the presenting sponsor of the S.C.O.R.E. (Scholastic Curriculum Of Recreation & Education) Shootout, which uses hockey to encourage a healthy and active lifestyle and rewards youth for their dedication to pursuing academic excellence.

Heston Commercial Corporation is a manufacturer of commercial and residential cooking appliances. They have partnered with the NHL Club for such events as the Anaheim Ducks Foundations' culinary forward event, Dux N Tux, to provide guest chefs and attendees with a chance to experience the brand first-hand and with Heston products.

Pacific Surfliner has also partnered with the Anaheim Ducks to grow ridership throughout Southern California. During the seasons, fans have received opportunities to receive Amtrak travel vouchers for convenient travel throughout Southern California.

Broadcasters
 John Ahlers, TV play-by-play
 Brian Hayward, TV color analyst
 Steve Carroll, Radio play-by-play

Past announcers include Matt McConnell (who was the radio play-by-play announcer from 1993-1996), Charlie Simmer (who was the radio analyst alongside McConnell from 1993–96), Brian Hamilton (who was the radio play-by-play announcer from 1996-99), Pat Conacher (who was the radio analyst from 1996-97), Darren Eliot (who was the radio analyst alongside Hamilton from 1996-99), Mike Greenlay (who was the radio analyst from 1999-01), Brent Severyn (who became the radio analyst beginning in 2005), and Chris Madsen (who was the television play-by-play announcer from 1993-02).

Television broadcasts are on Bally Sports SoCal or Bally Sports West, as well as KCOP for scheduling conflicts. Radio broadcasts are hosted on Ducks Stream, an online radio station available via TuneIn. Local over-the-air broadcasts were produced by KCAL-TV (1993–2006) and KDOC-TV (2006–2014). Before moving off local broadcast radio, KLAA was the team's radio flagship; KRDC (which was owned by the Ducks former team owner Disney) aired select games when in conflict.

Disney planned to start an ESPN West regional sports network for the 1998–99 season, which would also carry Anaheim Angels baseball games, but the plan was abandoned.

See also
 List of Anaheim Ducks draft picks
 List of Anaheim Ducks players

References

External links

 

 
National Hockey League teams
1993 establishments in California
Ice hockey clubs established in 1993
Ice hockey teams in California
National Hockey League in Greater Los Angeles
Pacific Division (NHL)
Ducks